Branko Kallay (30 December 1908 – 18 November 1995) was a Croatian athlete. He placed 24th in the men's decathlon at the 1928 Summer Olympics, representing Yugoslavia.

References

External links
 

1908 births
1995 deaths
Athletes (track and field) at the 1928 Summer Olympics
Croatian decathletes
Yugoslav decathletes
Olympic athletes of Yugoslavia
People from the Kingdom of Croatia-Slavonia